may refer to:


People
Bishin Jumonji, Japanese photographer
Chisako Jumonji, Japanese professional wrestler
Sachiko Jumonji, Japanese professional wrestler
Jūmonji Tomokazu, Japanese sumo wrestler
Takanobu Jumonji, Japanese cyclist

Places
Jūmonji, Akita, a town
Jūmonji Station, a railway station in Jumonji, Japan
Jumonji University, Jumonji, Japan

Popular culture
Jumanji (picture book), a 1981 fantasy children's picture book about an eponymous magical board game
Jumanji (franchise), a series of movies inspired by the books

Other uses
 Jumonji, an enzyme encoded by the JARID2 gene
 Jumonji C (JmJC) domain-containing demethylases, the largest group of histone demethylases .
 , a cross-shaped spear

See also
Jumanji, 1995 film